John C. Zimmerman Sr. (May 12, 1835 – October 26, 1935) was a Michigan politician.

Early life
Zimmerman was born on May 12, 1835 in Free City of Frankfurt. Zimmerman emigrated to the United States of America around 1853.

Political life

He was elected as the Mayor of the City of Flint in 1895 for a single 1-year term.

Personal life
John C. Zimmerman Sr. was married to Elizabeth Dietz. Together, they had seven children. Their second child, John C. Zimmerman Jr., would later serve as sheriff of Genesee County, Michigan.

Post-political life
He was buried at Glenwood Cemetery, Flint, after his death on October 26, 1935.

References

Mayors of Flint, Michigan
1835 births
1935 deaths
American centenarians
Men centenarians
Hessian emigrants to the United States
19th-century American politicians
Burials at Glenwood Cemetery (Flint, Michigan)